St. Paul Baptist Church and Cemetery is a historic African-American church and cemetery near Meeker, Oklahoma, United States and is the only known site in Lincoln County, Oklahoma. The church is located along N3420 Road, and the cemetery is located three-quarters of a mile east of the church complex. The church was built in 1940 after a fire destroyed the original church in 1939. It was added to the National Register in 2002.

References

Baptist churches in Oklahoma
Churches on the National Register of Historic Places in Oklahoma
Churches completed in 1940
Historic districts on the National Register of Historic Places in Oklahoma
National Register of Historic Places in Lincoln County, Oklahoma
Cemeteries on the National Register of Historic Places in Oklahoma
African-American history of Oklahoma